Loppington is a civil parish in Shropshire, England.  It contains 42 listed buildings that are recorded in the National Heritage List for England.  Of these, one is listed at Grade I, the highest of the three grades, and the others are at Grade II, the lowest grade.  The parish contains the village of Loppington and smaller settlements, including Burlton, and is otherwise rural.  Most of the listed buildings are houses and associated structures, cottages, farmhouses, and farm buildings, most of which are timber framed, and date from the 16th to the early 18th century.  The other listed buildings include a church, a sundial and tombs in its churchyard, and a pound, 


Key

Buildings

References

Citations

Sources

Lists of buildings and structures in Shropshire